Gulraiz Sadaf (born 27 December 1989) is a Pakistani first-class cricketer who plays for Multan cricket team.

References

External links
 

1989 births
Living people
Pakistani cricketers
Multan cricketers
Lahore Qalandars cricketers
Cricketers from Burewala
South Asian Games bronze medalists for Pakistan
South Asian Games medalists in cricket